Jessi Reaves (born 1986) is an American artist based in New York City who uses the relationship between art and design as a material in her practice, often making work that operates as both furniture and sculpture.

Biography
Born and raised in Portland, Oregon, Jessi Reaves studied painting at the Rhode Island School of Design, graduating with a BFA degree in 2010.

Jessi Reaves has been included in group exhibitions such as Natural Flavor at Ludlow 38, New York (2015); Pavillon de L'Esprit Nouveau: A 21st Century Show Home at Swiss Institute, New York (2015); and American Basketry at Bed Stuy Love Affair, New York (2014). She presented her first solo exhibition at Bridget Donahue, New York in April 2016. In 2017, she participated in the Whitney Biennial, creating inviting upholstered pieces meant to be utilized in the gallery. “Rejecting the sleek craftsmanship of iconic midcentury design, Reaves exaggerates markers of construction to an almost aggressive abundance,” note co-curators Christopher Y. Lew and Mia Locks.

In 2018, Reaves contributed a sculpture to the Eckhaus Latta show, Possessed, at the Whitney Museum. The first fashion-related exhibition at the Whitney in 21 years, the label curated their friends' art amongst the sculptural retail environment they created for the show.

Additionally in 2018, John Galliano invited Reaves to create raw, deconstructed sculptures for Maison Margiela's SS18.

Reaves was appointed Fall 2020 Teiger Mentor in the Arts at Cornell University - AAP program.

Exhibitions

Selected solo exhibitions

2016 – Now Showing: Jessi Reaves - SculptureCenter, Long Island City, NY
2016 – Jessi Reaves - Bridget Donahue, New York City
2017 – android stroll - Herald St, London, UK
2017 – 31 Candles - Jessi Reaves featuring Bradley Kronz & Jessi Reaves (Waiting for Boots), Dorich House Museum, Kingston University, London, UK
2018 – Kitchen Arrangement within The Domestic Plane: New Perspectives on Tabletop Art Objects - The Aldrich Contemporary Art Museum, Ridgefield, CT
2019 – Jessi Reaves II - Bridget Donahue, New York City

Selected group exhibitions

2009 – my space, Gelman Gallery, RISD, Providence, RI, curated by Gregory Fong, Sean Monahan, & Sarah Faux
2011 – The Denist’s Office, Golden Rule Gallery, Portland, Oregon
2013 – International Contemporary Furniture Fair, New York City
2015 – My Old Friend, My New Friend, My Girlfriend, My Cousin and My Mentor, Shoot the Lobster Gallery, NY, NY, curated by JPW3
2015 – American Basketry, Bed Stuy Love Affair, New York City, August 15 – September 6
2015 – La Casa del Cazu Merzu, Shoot the Lobster Gallery, New York City, September 19 – October 19
2015 – Seau Banco Carbon, Bed Stuy Love Affair Gallery, New York City, December 22 – January 2
2015 – Paramount Ranch, Shoot the Lobster Gallery, Los Angeles, CA
2015 – Living Rooms, Old Room Gallery, New York City, curated by Josh Kline
2015 – Summer Group Show, Germantown, New York, curated by Matt Moravec and Taylor Trabulus
2016 – Jessi Reaves & Sophie Stone: How to Remove Stains, Del Vaz Projects, Los Angeles, CA
2016 – Real Fine Arts Presents, New York, 809 Washington Street, New York City
2016 – Gallery Share, Off Vendome, New York City
2016/17 – A Cautionary Tale: Jessi Reaves and Bradley Kronz, A Palazzo Gallery, Brescia, Italy
2017 – Looking Back/ The 11th White Columns Annual, White Columns, New York
2017 – Ruins in the Snow, High Art, Paris, France
2017 – Whitney Biennial 2017, Whitney Museum of American Art, New York City
2018 – Liminal Focus, Barbara Mathes Gallery, New York City
2018 – Ginny Casey and Jessi Reaves, Institute of Contemporary Art Philadelphia, Pennsylvania
2018 – Midtown, Lever House, organized by Maccarone and Salon 94, New York City
2018 – Steps to Aeration, Tanya Leighton, Berlin, Germany
2018 – Interiors, Galerie Maria Bernheim, Zurich, Switzerland,
2018 – Loopstar Future Feel Good: Jessi Reaves, Mother Culture, Los Angeles, CA
2018 – Sit-In, September Gallery, Hudson, New York
2018 – The Phantom of Liberty: Contemporary Works in the RISD Museum Collection, RISD Museum, Providence, Rhode Island
2018 – SI ONSITE, Swiss Institute, New York City
2018 – Eckhaus Latta: Possessed, Whitney Museum of American Art, New York City, August 3 – October 8
2018/19 – Carnegie International, 57th Edition, Carnegie Museum, Pittsburgh, Pennsylvania, October 13 – March 25, 2019

Awards
2017 Special Mention, Hublot Design Prize, Switzerland

Permanent collections
Whitney Museum of American Art, New York City
RISD Museum of Art, Providence, RI

References

External links
Jessi Reaves | Bridget Donahue
Jessi Reaves - Contemporary Art Daily

Artists from Portland, Oregon
Rhode Island School of Design alumni
American women sculptors
21st-century American women artists
Mixed-media artists
Living people
1986 births
Sculptors from Oregon